Stegonotus is a genus of snakes in the family Colubridae. Species of the genus Stegonotus are native to Australia, Indonesia, and New Guinea.

Species
The genus Stegonotus contains 25 species which are recognized as being valid.
Stegonotus admiraltiensis  – Admiralty Islands groundsnake
Stegonotus aplini  – Purari White groundsnake
Stegonotus aruensis  – Aru Islands groundsnake
Stegonotus australis  – Australian groundsnake
Stegonotus ayamaru  – Ayamaru groundsnake
Stegonotus batjanensis  – North Moluccan groundsnake, Batjan frog-eating snake 
Stegonotus borneensis  – Borneo groundsnake, Borneo frog-eating snake 
Stegonotus caligocephalus  – Dark-headed Sabah groundsnake
Stegonotus cucullatus  – Bird's Head Peninsula groundsnake, slatey-grey snake
Stegonotus derooijae  – De Rooij's groundsnake, Raja Ampat groundsnake
Stegonotus diehli  – Diehl's little ground snake
Stegonotus dorsalis  – Monumbo groundsnake
Stegonotus florensis  – Flores ground snake
Stegonotus guentheri  – D'Entrecasteaux Archipelago groundsnake, Milne Bay groundsnake
Stegonotus heterurus  – Bismarck ground snake
Stegonotus iridis  – Iridescent groundsnake, Rainbow groundsnake
Stegonotus keyensis  – Kei Islands groundsnake
Stegonotus lividus  – Semau Island groundsnake
Stegonotus melanolabiatus  – Black-lipped groundsnake 
Stegonotus modestus  – Central Moluccan groundsnake
Stegonotus muelleri  – Philippine groundsnake
Stegonotus nancuro  – Timor groundsnake
Stegonotus parvus  – Yapen Island groundsnake, Yapen little groundsnake
Stegonotus poechi  – Pöch's groundsnake
Stegonotus reticulatus  – Reticulated groundsnake
Stegonotus sutteri  – Sumba groundsnake

Nota bene: A binomial authority in parentheses indicates that the species was originally described in a genus other than Stegonotus.

Etymology

The specific name, aplini, is in honor of Australian herpetologist and mammalogist Kenneth Peter "Ken" Aplin.

The specific name, derooijae, is in honor of Dutch herpetologist Nelly de Rooij.

The specific name, diehli, is in honor of German missionary Wilhelm Diehl (1874–1940), who collected herpetological specimens in New Guinea.

The specific name, guentheri, is in honor of German-born British herpetologist Albert Günther.

The specific name, muelleri, is in honor of German herpetologist Johannes Peter Müller.

The specific name, poechi, is in honor of Austrian ethnologist & anthropologist Rudolf Pöch.

The specific name, sutteri, is in honor of Swiss ornithologist Ernst Sutter.

References

Further reading
Boulenger GA (1893). Catalogue of the Snakes in the British Museum (Natural History). Volume I., Containing the Families ... Colubridæ Aglyphæ, part. London: Trustees of the British Museum (Natural History). (Taylor and Francis, printers). xiii + 448 pp. + Plates I-XXVIII. (Genus Stegonotus, pp. 364–365).
Duméril A-M-C, Bibron G, Duméril A[-H-A] (1854). Erpétologie générale ou histoire naturelle complète des reptiles. Tome septième. Première partie. Comprenant l'histoire des serpents non venimeux. [=General Herpetology or the Complete Natural History of the Reptiles. Volume 7. First Part. Containing the Natural History of the Nonvenomous Snakes]. Paris: Roret. xvi + 780 pp. (Stegonotus, new genus, pp. 680–682; S. muelleri, new species, pp. 682–683). (in French).
Ruane S, Richards SJ, McVay JD, Tjaturadi B, Krey K, Austin CC (2017). "Cryptic and non-cryptic diversity in New Guinea ground snakes of the genus Stegonotus Duméril, Bibron and Duméril, 1854: a description of four new species (Squamata: Colubridae)". Journal of Natural History 30: 1-28.

Stegonotus
Snake genera
Taxa named by André Marie Constant Duméril
Taxa named by Gabriel Bibron
Taxa named by Auguste Duméril